Al-Mashrah Stadium is a multi-purpose stadium in Maysan, Iraq. It is currently used mostly for football matches and is the home stadium of Al-Mashrah FC. The stadium has a capacity crowd of 2,000 and is owned and operated by the Ministry of Youth and Sports.

Location 

See also 
List of football stadiums in Iraq

References 

Football venues in Iraq
Athletics (track and field) venues in Iraq
Multi-purpose stadiums in Iraq
Sports venues completed in 2014